Preiļi parish is an administrative unit of Preiļi Municipality, Latvia.

References 

Parishes of Latvia
Preiļi Municipality